Elizabeth Reed may refer to:

Elizabeth Armstrong Reed, American Oriental scholar
In Memory of Elizabeth Reed, jazz-influenced instrumental from The Allman Brothers Band
Betty Reed, politician

See also
Elizabeth Reid (disambiguation)
Betsy Reed, editor